Ellös is a locality situated in Orust Municipality, Västra Götaland County, Sweden. The locality had 998 inhabitants in 2010.

References 

Populated places in Västra Götaland County
Populated places in Orust Municipality